Dr. Wilhelm Lautenbach (* 26 August 1891 in Zwinge; † 24 May 1948 in Davos) was a German official at the Economics Ministry at the beginning of the 1920s.

He is known primarily for the so-called Lautenbach Plan, which was discussed at a secret conference on 16 and 17 September 1931 and first rejected but parts of it later implemented by the Papen and Schleicher governments. He has been called "a pre-Keynes Keynesian".

The German economist Wolfgang Stützel who developed the Balances Mechanics (German: Saldenmechanik) appreciates Wilhelm Lautenbach regarding his  credit theory of money (Kreditmechanik), calls it "Lautenbachsche Kreditmechanik".

Works (selection) 
 Lautenbach Plan (Möglichkeiten einer Konjunkturbelebung durch Investition und Kreditausweitung), 9. September 1931 (PDF; 151 kB).

References 

1891 births
1948 deaths
People from Eichsfeld (district)
People from the Province of Saxony
German economists